Ovalteenies are round sweets made of compressed Ovaltine. They are popular with children in Australia and the Philippines and are sold in many canteens in schools.

The Ovalteenies were changed to being oval in shape during the early 2000s, as it seemed more appropriate, fitting the name from which it derived: from the Latin ovum (or egg). However, popular demand later led to the sweets' production reverting to their original circular shape.

See also
 Ovaltine
 Maltesers
 Whoppers another type of malted milk candy

Brand name confectionery
Associated British Foods brands